Misa de Gallo (Spanish for "Rooster's Mass", also Misa de los Pastores, "Shepherds' Mass;" Portuguese: Missa do Galo; Catalan: Missa del gall) is the Midnight Mass celebrated in many former Spanish colonies on Christmas Eve and sometimes in the days immediately preceding Christmas.

History
The tradition of midnight Mass on Christmas Eve was first chronicled by Egeria, a Galician woman who went on a pilgrimage to the Holy Land around 381. She witnessed how the early Catholics of Jerusalem honored the Christmas mystery with a midnight vigil at Bethlehem. This was followed by a torchlight procession to Jerusalem, arriving at the Church of the Resurrection at dawn.

Half a century later, Pope Sixtus III, inspired by the midnight vigil, instituted the practice of a midnight Mass after the cockcrow in the grotto-like oratory of the famed Basilica of Santa Maria Maggiore. There are discrepancies, however, as to the exact time of the cockcrow due to the fact that the ancient Romans set it at the start of the day.

In 1587, the head priest of the Church of San Agustin de Acolman in Mexico, Diego de Soria, petitioned Pope Sixtus V to allow the Mass to be held outdoors because the church could not accommodate the large number of attendees at the evening celebration.

Misa de Gallo in different countries
The tradition of Misa de Gallo is still observed today, mostly by Spanish-speaking Roman Catholic countries in Latin America and in the Philippines.

Spain
In Spain, locals begin Christmas Eve by lighting small oil lamps in every home, then proceed to church to hear Midnight Mass.

The most popular of these holy services is in the Basílica de Montserrat also known as Santa Maria de Montserrat, a Benedictine monastery built on the steep cliffs of the Montserrat mountain range. The Escolania de Montserrat, Europe's oldest boys' choir known for their angelic voices, graces the celebration.

Bolivia
Bolivians attend Christmas Eve Mass, and the celebration is followed by a sit-down meal featuring a traditional bowl of picana del pollo. It is a stew made of chicken with peas, carrots, and potatoes.

Philippines

Simbang Gabi (Tagalog for "Night Mass"), also called Misa de Aguinaldo ("gift mass"), is the Filipino version of the Misa de Gallo. It traditionally begins on December 16 and ends on December 24. In most parts of Philippines, however, the term "Misa de Gallo" specifically only refers to the last mass on Christmas Eve. In Zamboangueño Chavacano, the series of masses is also called Misa de los Pastores. 

Simbang Gabi is associated with a nine-day novena procession, as well as a reenactment of the search for lodgings by Joseph and the pregnant Virgin Mary known as the Panunulúyan.

Venezuela
In Venezuela, the Misa de Gallo is only one of a series of Masses held at dawn called Misa de Aguinaldo. The name comes from the Spanish word for "Christmas box". The Masses are held for nine days and culminate on Christmas Eve.

Puerto Rico (U.S.)
Puerto Ricans celebrate the Mass by singing Christmas songs, which they call aguinaldos. The more religious versions of these songs are called villancicos and the ones with a Criollo inspiration are called décimas navideñas.

See also
 Rorate Coeli

References

Catholic Church in the Philippines
Christmas in the Philippines
Nativity of Jesus in worship and liturgy
Latin religious words and phrases
Mass in the Catholic Church

tl:Simbang Gabi